The International Journal of Healthcare Information Systems and Informatics is a quarterly peer-reviewed scientific journal which publishes research articles and reviews about the innovations and applications of new technologies in the area of information systems and informatics in the healthcare industry. The journal was established in 2006 and is published by IGI Global. The editors-in-chief are Qiang Cheng (University of Kentucky) and Joseph Tan (McMaster University).

Abstracting and indexing
The journal is abstracted and indexed in:
Emerging Sources Citation Index
EBSCO databases
Ei Compendex

Inspec
ProQuest databases
Scopus

References

External links

Creative Commons Attribution-licensed journals
Healthcare journals
Computer science journals
Quarterly journals
English-language journals
Publications established in 2006
IGI Global academic journals